The Iglesia y Convento de las Capuchinas is a notable convent and church in Antigua Guatemala, Guatemala. It is one of the finest examples of an 18th-century convent in Guatemala. It was consecrated in 1736 but like the rest of the city suffered damage during the 1751 and 1773 earthquakes respectively, and was abandoned by order of the Captain General at the time.

History 

The building complex, originally called "Convento e Iglesia de Nuestra Señora del Pilar de Zaragoza" -Convent and Church of Our Lady of Zaragoza-, was approved by king Felipe V in 1725 just when the Order of Capuchins arrived to Santiago de los Caballeros. Construction started on 1731 and was blessed on 1736 under Diego de Porres supervision; in fact, it was the last convent to be built in the city, and the first one that stopped asking for a donation to the new nuns, allowing then poor ladies to embrace religious life.

Daily routine for the nuns was ruled by strict regulations which include for some the maximum discipline on poverty, penance and fasting; also, they should survive on the tithing only; nevertheless, since the arrival of this convent there were two kinds of nuns in Santiago de los Caballeros: discalced and urban.

In 1920, prince Wilhelm of Sweden visited Antigua Guatemala and mentioned that the old Capuchin monastery with its many underground passages from the monks' cells to those of the nuns was worth a visit, especially one part where the cells were built in a circle surrounding a central common chamber.

Image Gallery

See also 

 1773 Guatemala earthquake

Notes and references

References

Bibliography

External links
 

Convents in Guatemala
Roman Catholic churches in Antigua Guatemala
Roman Catholic churches completed in 1736
18th-century Roman Catholic church buildings in Guatemala